Gage County Courthouse is a historic courthouse for Gage County, Nebraska in the county seat of Beatrice, Nebraska at 612 Grant Street.
It was listed on the National Register of Historic Places on January 10, 1990.

It was built from 1890 until 1892 in a Richardsonian Romanesque architectural style. It was renovated in 2008.

The building was designed by Gunn and Curtiss (Frederick C. Gunn and Louis Singleton Curtiss) and M.T. Murphy was the building contractor.

References

1890 establishments in Nebraska
Courthouses on the National Register of Historic Places in Nebraska
Government buildings completed in 1890
National Register of Historic Places in Gage County, Nebraska